Liu Yin (190 – 269), courtesy name Xiuran, was a military officer of the state of Shu Han in the Three Kingdoms period of China.

Life
Liu Yin was born in Chengdu, the capital of Yi Province (covering present-day Sichuan and Chongqing). When he was young, Liu Yin was already famous along with his fellow natives Du Zhen and Liu Shen. He was known as someone who was forthright, sincere and bright. Moreover, he was a generous man to his friends. Thanks to those qualities, he became a successful military officer. Later, he was a supporter of Grand General Jiang Wei and accompanied him during his many northern campaigns. When he met the enemy into battles. Liu Yin showed skills in improvising plans, would fearlessly charge through the enemy lines and break their formations. His valour and cleverness made him popular in the army and a champion among the soldiers. For his exploits, he was nominated as General of the Standard (牙門將), Administrator of Ba commandary (巴郡太守) and Cavalry Commandant (騎都尉). Later, he was summoned back to be the new Garrison Commander of Huangjin (黃金圍督) in Hanzhong commandary.

During Cao Wei's invasion of Shu Han in 263, Zhong Hui led his army to the Hanzhong region where most of the local garrisons surrendered to him without opposition. Only Liu Yin refused to surrender; he held onto his strong position and would not be displaced. Although Zhong Hui's generals were ordered to attack him, they were beaten back and could not capture his garrison. After his abdication to Deng Ai, Liu Shan sent Liu Yin a handwritten order commanding him to surrender, only then did he surrender to Zhong Hui. Sima Zhao heard of this, was greatly impressed and came to deeply respect Liu Yin for his loyalty.

One year later, in 264, Liu Yin was summoned to Hedong where he was appointed as a Consultant Gentleman (議郎). When Sima Yan established the Jin dynasty, he assigned Liu Yin to be the Administrator of Xihe (西河太守). Liu Yin stayed in that office for the next three years before resigning his commission on account of his old age. Before his death, he asked for his remains to be sent back to his homeland in the Shu region. He died among his family at the age of 79 years old.

Liu Yin's elder son, Liu Chong (柳充) later became Prefect of Liandao (連道令). While his younger son, Liu Chu (柳初) was recommended as an abundant talent candidate.

Chang Qu in the Huayang Guo Zhi appraised Liu Yin as a fierce warrior possessing both righteousness and virtue.

Du Zhen
As previously mentioned, Du Zhen (杜禎), whose courtesy name was Wenran (文然), was born in Chengdu and was famous along with Liu Yin and Liu Shen. His father, Du Qiong was a reputed confucian scholar. During the Jianxing era (建興; 223–237) of Shu Han. He worked alongside Zhuge Liang and assisted him in managing the State's affairs. After Jin conquered Shu, he became an official of Jin. He reached his highest position when he became the governor of both Liang and Yi provinces. His son also named Du Zhen (杜珍), whose courtesy name was Bozhong (伯重), was known as a talented scholar later was appointed with greater responsabilities as an official whose role was to protect the army. He had a son, Du Mi (杜彌), whose courtesy name was Jingwen (景文).

Liu Shen
As previously mentioned, Liu Shen (柳伸), whose courtesy name was Yahou (雅厚), was born in Chengdu and was famous along with Liu Yin and Du Zhen. He was a veteran of Shu Han alongside Liu Yin and Du Zhen serving successively four emperors (Liu Bei, Liu Shan, Cao Huan and Sima Yan) and three dynasties. Like Du Zhen, during the Jianxing era (建興; 223–237) of Shu Han. He worked alongside Zhuge Liang and assisted him in managing the State's affairs. After the fall of Shu, he served Jin as official and worked as Administrator of Hanjia (漢嘉) and Badong (巴東). As a well known scholar, he was later recommended and appointed as assistant under Du Zhen (杜禎) to guard Liang and Yi provinces. His son, Liu Chun (柳純), whose courtesy name was Weishu (偉叔) was famous as a man of virtuous moral character and greatly talented. He served many positions, among them were Administrator, Captain and Superintendent.

See also
 Lists of people of the Three Kingdoms

Notes

References

 Chang Qu (4th century). Chronicles of Huayang (Huayang Guo Zhi).

190 births
269 deaths
Shu Han generals
Cao Wei generals
People from Chengdu